The Uruguayan Segunda División was a football league in Uruguay, organised by the AUF. First held in 1903, this competition was one of the divisions that formed the Uruguayan football league system, and was contested until 1914 when it was replaced by Divisional Intermedia.

Divisional Intermedia was the second division of Uruguay until 1942, when the Segunda División Profesional was created as a professional football league, therefore Intermedia became the third division.

There are few records of Segunda División and almost nothing about results or further data of each season. Moreover, on some occasions Segunda División champions were not allowed by the AUF to participate in Primera División. One of those teams was River Plate, that was allowed to participate in Primera only after having won the Segunda División three times. Therefore River Plate played its first Primera División tournament in Primera División 1907.

River Plate remains as the most winning team of Segunda División with 3 titles.

List of champions 
The following list include all champions:

Notes

References

1
Sports leagues established in 1903
1903 establishments in Uruguay
1914 disestablishments